Dudley Chase Denison (September 13, 1819 – February 10, 1905) was a nineteenth-century politician and lawyer from Vermont. He served as a member of the United States House of Representatives two terms, and was also a member of the Vermont House of Representatives and Vermont State Senate.

Biography
Denison was born in Royalton, Vermont, son of Dr. Joseph Adam Denison and Rachel (Chase) Denison. He attended Royalton Academy and graduated third in his class from the University of Vermont in 1840. He later received a Master of Arts degree from the University of Vermont. He studied law and was admitted to the bar in 1845. He began the practice of law in Royalton.

Denison served as a member of the Vermont State Senate in 1853 and 1854, and served as the State's Attorney for Windsor County from 1858 until 1860. He was a member of the Vermont House of Representatives from 1860 until 1864. He was a trustee for Norwich University from 1850 until 1887, and a trustee for the University of Vermont from 1862 to 1865.

From 1864 to 1869, Denison served as the United States Attorney for the District of Vermont. He also served as a director of the National Life Insurance Company.

He was elected as an Independent Republican candidate to the 44th United States Congress and reelected as a Republican candidate to the 45th United States Congress, serving from March 4, 1875, until March 3, 1879. He was not a candidate for reelection in 1878.

After serving in Congress, Denison resumed the practice of law in Royalton. He died in Royalton on February 10, 1905, and is interred in the North Royalton cemetery.

Personal life
Denison married Eunice Dunbar on December 22, 1846. They had seven children: Joseph Dudley Denison, Catherine Amanda Denison, John Henry Denison, Gertrude May Denison, Lucy Dunbar Denison, Edward Denison and Elizabeth Denison.

He was the nephew of Dudley Chase and Philander Chase, and the cousin of Salmon P. Chase.

See also 

 Chase family

References

Further reading
 "Men of Vermont: an illustrated biographical history of Vermonters and sons of Vermont" by Redfield Proctor, Charles H. Davenport and Levi Knight Fuller, published by the Transcript publishing company, 1894.

External links
 
 Biographical Directory of the United States Congress
 
 The Political Graveyard: Denison, Dudley Chase (1819-1905)
 Govtrack.us: Rep. Dudley Denison
 Our Campaigns: Denison, Dudley Chase,

1819 births
1905 deaths
Members of the United States House of Representatives from Vermont
Members of the Vermont House of Representatives
Vermont state senators
Vermont lawyers
University of Vermont alumni
United States Attorneys for the District of Vermont
Vermont Independents
Vermont Republicans
Independent Republican members of the United States House of Representatives
19th-century American politicians
State's attorneys in Vermont